Liezel Huber (née Horn; born 21 August 1976) is a South African-American retired tennis player who represented the United States internationally since August 2007. Huber has won four Grand Slam titles in women's doubles with partner Cara Black, one with Lisa Raymond, and two mixed doubles titles with Bob Bryan. On 12 November 2007, she became the co-world No. 1 in doubles with Cara Black. On 19 April 2010, Huber became the sole No. 1 for the first time in her career.

Personal life
At age 15, she moved from South Africa to the United States to attend the Van Der Meer Tennis Academy in Hilton Head, South Carolina in 1992. Huber has since resided in the U.S. and became a naturalized American citizen in July 2007. She married Tony Huber, an American, in February 2000. In 2005, she started a foundation, 'Liezel's Cause', to raise money and gather basic supplies to assist the victims of Hurricane Katrina.

She competed for the United States in the 2008 Beijing Olympics in doubles, partnering with former World No. 1 (in both singles and doubles) Lindsay Davenport; the pair lost in the quarterfinals.  At the 2012 London Olympics, she teamed with Lisa Raymond. Together they reached the semi-finals, losing to Hlaváčková and Hradecká of the Czech Republic. They then lost the bronze medal match to Kirilenko and Petrova of Russia. In the mixed doubles she teamed with Bob Bryan but lost in the first round.

Professional career
Liezel Huber is primarily a doubles specialist, having achieved one of the best careers in this discipline. She has won 64 women's doubles titles in her career; of which 53 are on the WTA Tour and 11 on the ITF Women's Circuit. In singles, her greatest result in her career was reaching to the quarterfinals at the tournament in Pattaya City in 2001, where she lost to Henrieta Nagyová. She participated in two Grand Slam singles main draws, losing to Lindsay Davenport in the second round of the 1998 French Open. She lost in the 1999 US Open first round to Raluca Sandu. Her highest singles ranking was world no. 131, which she achieved on 29 March 1999. She enjoyed the majority of her first eight years on tour on the ITF Circuit.

Huber has enjoyed successful women's partnerships with Magdalena Maleeva, Ai Sugiyama, Martina Navratilova, Lindsay Davenport, Cara Black, Sania Mirza, Nadia Petrova, Bethanie Mattek-Sands, María José Martínez Sánchez, and Lisa Raymond. Huber has been in the final of all four Grand Slams, winning in all except for the French Open. She has won a total of five Grand Slam women's doubles titles with three partners in ten finals with four partners, and finished as a titlist in two of her five mixed doubles finals.

Huber and her Zimbabwean partner Black made up what many tennis experts regard as one of the greatest women's doubles teams in history between mid-2005. and early 2010. Together, the pair reached seven women's doubles finals, winning four. The duo won a total of 29 titles together on the WTA Tour. The partnership suddenly broke up in April 2010.

Huber has also enjoyed success in mixed doubles, winning two titles with American men's doubles legend Bob Bryan, at the 2009 French Open and 2010 US Open. She reached her first career mixed final with Bob's brother Mike at the 2001 Wimbledon Championships, and two additional finals, at the 2005 Australian Open with Kevin Ullyett, and at the 2008 US Open with Jamie Murray.

Huber has also enjoyed impressive success in the Fed Cup national competition. She logged a 9–3 record on the South Africa Fed Cup team, with all but one match being in doubles. Huber is now a major member of the United States Fed Cup team, compiling a 6–2 record in doubles play. In the competition, Huber has played with Julie Ditty, Vania King, Bethanie Mattek-Sands, Melanie Oudin, and Sloane Stephens.

Liezel Huber served as executive director of Tennis, at the New York Junior Tennis & Learning Cary Leeds Center, in Bronx Crotona Park. As of 4 January 2021, she is Director of Tennis and Racquets at The River Club of New York.

Grand Slam finals

Doubles: 10 (5–5)

Mixed doubles: 5 (2–3)

Olympics

Doubles: 1 Bronze medal match (0–1)

WTA career finals

Doubles: 92 (53–39)

ITF finals

Singles (0–4)

Doubles (11–9)

Women's doubles performance timeline

References

External links

 
 
 

1976 births
Afrikaner people
American female tennis players
American people of Afrikaner descent
Australian Open (tennis) champions
Delaware Smash
French Open champions
Grand Slam (tennis) champions in mixed doubles
Grand Slam (tennis) champions in women's doubles
Living people
Olympic tennis players of South Africa
Olympic tennis players of the United States
People from Houston
People with acquired American citizenship
South African emigrants to the United States
South African female tennis players
Sportspeople from Durban
Tennis people from Texas
Tennis players at the 2000 Summer Olympics
Tennis players at the 2012 Summer Olympics
Wimbledon champions
21st-century American women
WTA number 1 ranked doubles tennis players
ITF World Champions